The Sex of Angels is a 1968 film directed by Ugo Liberatore.

Plot
In Italy, Nora, an heiress at odds with her father, welcomes her friends Nancy and Nora during a summer break. The plan is to take Nora's father’s yacht (without his permission) and head for the Dalmatian coast of Croatia. When Nora’s boyfriend refuses to join the trio, they decide to find a desirable male with no serious attachments to take along. They meet Marco, a medical student who is a total stranger, at a dance club, and even though he has a casual girlfriend, he agrees to meet Nancy the next day for a swim. The three women take out the yacht, find Marco swimming along, and effectively abduct him onto the vessel. 

Initially, Marco is more amused than concerned about the abrupt change in plans, and proceeds to try making time with each of the girls, only to find that Nancy is either gay, bi or frigid, Carla is clearly gay and not interested in him, and Nora claims she is saving her virtue for a black man. The women's intentions appear more sinister when, upon reaching Croatian waters and having to submit to inspection, Marco, who, since he was taken while swimming, has no passport or clothes, must hide while the authorities board the yacht. Once the patrol leaves, the women reveal their primary intention of the trip: to experiment with LSD, and tape record their trip since they may not remember details. The foursome ingest dosed sugar cubes and submit to the drug.

The next morning, Nora is moaning in pain, Marco sees Nancy and Carla in bed, and discovers that he has been shot; the bullet is embedded in his chest so he is not bleeding, but is still at great risk of dying from the wound. The women remember nothing, but are reluctant to revisit the tape; Nancy hides it, fearing that hearing what happened will divide them. They pull into a port to get Marco morphine. The druggist initially refuses to sell them morphine without a prescription, and rebuffs Nora and Nancy's offer to trade it for sex, but when Carla volunteers she is a virgin, he agrees to provide it in exchange. Upon returning to the yacht, as he becomes weaker and weaker from his injury, Carla takes pity on Marco, and tries pressuring her friends to return to Italy quickly to get him to a hospital, but the other two, fearing they could be blamed and arrested for the shooting, seem to be slow-walking the trip home, and actively thwart Marco's attempts to seek help.

Before reaching port, Marco dies from his wounds. They agree to listen to the tape to try finding out what happened during their LSD ingest, but the tape is blank, and Carla deduces that Nancy did not have the microphone on, deliberately sabotaging the intent. His body is set adrift in an inflatable dingy before the yacht docks. The women put on a brave face back at home, but it is clear the event has broken what tenuous bond they shared before. Carla leaves Nora and Nancy, runs down to the end of a pier, and, after some contemplation, drowns herself.

Cast
Bernhard de Vries as Marco
Rosemary Dexter as Nancy
Doris Kunstmann as Nora
Laura Troschel as Carla

Release
The Sex of Angels was given an X rating in the United States. United Artists, the film's worldwide distributor, released it stateside under their Lopert Pictures division.

References

External links

1968 films
1960s Italian films
1960s Italian-language films
Italian drama films
1968 drama films